The  is a railway line in Hyōgo Prefecture, Japan, operated by West Japan Railway Company (JR West), which connects the cities of Kakogawa and Tamba.

The  line begins at Kakogawa Station on the JR Kobe Line (Sanyō Main Line) and ends at Tanikawa Station on the Fukuchiyama Line.

History
The Banshu Railway opened the Kakogawa - Nishiwakishi section in 1913, and extended the line to Tanikawa in 1924. The company was nationalised in 1943.

Freight services ceased in 1986, and CTC signalling was commissioned on the entire line in 2004.

Former branches of the Kakogawa Line included the Takasago Line (connected at Kakogawa Station), the Miki Line (connected at Yakujin Station) and the Kajiya Line (connected at Nomura Station, i.e. present-day Nishiwakishi Station).

Stations

Rolling stock 
 103 series EMUs
 125 series EMUs

Former
 KiHa 20 DMUs
 KiHa 23 DMUs
  KiHa 30/35 DMUs
 KiHa 37 DMUs
 KiHa 40/47 DMUs

References

Lines of West Japan Railway Company
Rail transport in Hyōgo Prefecture
1067 mm gauge railways in Japan
Railway lines opened in 1913
1913 establishments in Japan